Kainoa Agrifino Locquiao Bailey (born August 2, 1995) is a professional soccer player who plays as an attacking midfielder for Stallion Laguna in the Philippines Football League.

Personal life
Kainoa is the older brother of Zico Bailey who currently plays for FC Cincinnati in Major League Soccer.

Career

Bayer Leverkusen II
On August 7, 2013, Bailey signed with Bayer 04 Leverkusen, where he played with their reserve team during 2013 and 2014 just before Leverkusen disbanded their reserve team.

LA Galaxy II
After his release from Bayer Leverkusen, Bailey signed with USL Pro club LA Galaxy II on August 20, 2014.

Bailey was released by LA Galaxy II in January 2017.

FC Columbus
In 2018, Bailey joined National Premier Soccer League club FC Columbus.

Des Moines Menace
Bailey went on trial with Real Monarchs during the 2019 preseason, scoring a goal during the Monarchs' win over the Utah Valley Wolverines.

He later joined USL League Two club Des Moines Menace.

Azkals Development Team
In 2020, he joined Philippines Football League club Azkals Development Team.

Stallion Laguna
In 2022, Bailey joined Stallion Laguna.

International career
Born in United States of America to a Jamaican father and a Filipina mother, Bailey is eligible to represent  Jamaica, United States and Philippines at international level.

Philippines
In June 2019, Bailey received his first call up for the Philippines in a friendly against China.

Career Statistics

Club

References

External links

1995 births
Living people
American soccer players
American expatriate soccer players
Citizens of the Philippines through descent
Nashville Metros players
Bayer 04 Leverkusen II players
LA Galaxy II players
Association football forwards
Soccer players from Nevada
USL League Two players
USL Championship players
American people of Jamaican descent
American sportspeople of Filipino descent
Azkals Development Team players